Saint Ansurius (also Aduri, Asurius, Isauri) (died 925 AD) was a Galician bishop.  He became bishop of Orense in 915.  In 922, he gave up his post to become a monk at the monastery he helped found, Ribas de Sil.

References

External links
Saints of the 10th century
St. Ansurius
St. Ansurius

Medieval Spanish saints
Bishops of Ourense
925 deaths
10th-century Galician bishops
10th-century Christian saints
Year of birth unknown
10th-century people from the Kingdom of León